Regent Records has been the name of at least two different record labels:

Regent Records (US) - an American-based company
Regent Records (UK) - a British company